Carlos Lugo may refer to:

 Carlos Lugo (Paraguayan footballer) (born 1976), Paraguayan football defender
 Carlos Lugo (baseball) (born 1985), baseball shortstop
 Carlos Lugo (Colombian footballer) (born 1953), Colombian former footballer
 Carlos José Lugo, baseball analyst in the Dominican Republic
 Carlos Alberto Lugo, Mexican footballer